Herpetopoma crassilabrum is a species of sea snail, a marine gastropod mollusk in the family Chilodontidae.

Distribution
This marine species occurs off Sri Lanka.

References

Gastropods described in 1905

crassilabrum